Maragadha Naanayam is a 2017 Indian Tamil-language fantasy comedy film written and directed by ARK Saravan in his directorial debut. The film stars Aadhi and Nikki Galrani while Anandaraj, Munishkanth, Daniel Annie Pope, Mime Gopi, and Kota Srinivasa Rao play supporting roles. The music was composed by first-timer Dhibu Ninan Thomas with cinematography by PV Shankar and editing by Prasanna GK.

The film was released in 16 June 2017 in Tamil and Telugu languages, the latter titled Marakathamani.

Plot 
Senguttuvan (Aadhi) and Elango (Daniel Annie Pope) are two small-time crooks who work for a local jewel smuggler named "Nochukuppam" Ramdoss (Ramdoss). Senguttavan is attracted to a young woman Chanakya (Nikki Galrani) whom he sees every morning at the bus stop, however he never manages to speak to her. Chanakya eventually gets married, but her husband doesn't treat her well and physically and verbally abuses her in public.

Meanwhile, a Chinese businessman comes to the city looking to acquire an antique emerald medallion named "Maragatha Naanayam". This stone was owned by an ancient king named Irumporai and is rumoured to be cursed; anyone who laid their hands on the stone died due to a lorry accident, with the lorry rumoured to be driven by the spirit of King Irumporai. He hires a contractor named John (Mime Gopi), who has connections with local gangs that could do the job. He offers 10,00,00,000 for the contract, but no one is willing to do the job as they are afraid of the curse. Only Senguttavan, who is frustrated at the small-time work he is doing under Ramdoss, is interested in the offer as he wants to involve himself in something big and challenging. Elango convinces Senguttuvan to approach a local priest (Kota Srinivasa Rao) who could protect them from the curse. The priest hands Senguttavan and Elango a lemon, at which point the ghosts of the 132 people killed by the curse are revealed to them. The priest tells them that if they are going to pursue the stone, they will need to seek the help of one of the ghosts.

Back home, Senguttuvan and Elango complete the ritual to summon one of the ghosts: Elango's uncle Chidambaram. Unfortunately, before the ghost could appear, the duo is interrupted by the news that Ramdoss has died due to a heart attack. During Ramdoss's burial, the lemon accidentally slips from Senguttavan's pocket and falls on Ramdoss's hand, as a result of which Chidambaram's ghost possesses Ramdoss's body and appears in front of Senguttavan and Elango the following morning, much to their shock. The ghost decides to use three recently dead people and possess them with ghosts of three other people killed by the curse to help Senguttavan and Elango in their mission. The first is an old beggar Selvaraj (Sangili Murugan) who died in his sleep alongside the road. The second is a man (Arunraja Kamaraj) who got decapitated in a freak accident. The third happens to be Chanakya, who hanged herself. Chidambaram successfully brings two of the ghosts to their new bodies, but one of them, a Tamil teacher, has trouble staying in Selvaraj's body and keeps jumping in and out of the corpse.

Senguttuvan, Elango, and the three ghosts, now in their borrowed bodies, pursue the emerald stone. Following an initial lead, they interrogate Pandurangan (M. S. Bhaskar) while posing as the henchmen of a powerful local gang leader "Twinkle" Ramanathan (Anandaraj). This leads them to recover an emerald medallion, which turns out to be a fake. However, their methods draw the attention of Ramanathan. He previously rejected the idea of pursuing the stone but changes his mind. After realizing that they recovered a replica, the group continues to piece clues together. They find the man who made the fake, who is now on his deathbed. Before he dies, the man gives them clues to who ordered the fake medallion - a local doctor named Krishnan (Gajaraj) who happens to be one of the men killed by the curse. They find his son, who is also a doctor, and kidnap him. Before they can get him to tell them where the original medallion is, they are caught by Ramanathan's henchmen and are taken to his torture chamber. They manage to escape the torturers and eventually find the original medallion.

Despite Chidambaram's warning, Senguttuvan and Elango touch the stone and are thereby cursed. They arrange for a meeting with John and the Chinese businessman for the exchange, but on the way, they are pursued by the mysterious driverless lorry. John and the Chinese businessman are run over by the lorry and killed. Senguttuvan manages to elude the lorry initially and recover the suitcase full of money. They then run into the Tamil teacher, who is in Selvaraj's body. He tells them that they must return the stone to the King's grave to lift the curse. On the way to the gravesite, they are pursued by both the mystery lorry and Ramanathan's gang, who are hell bent on taking the stone from them. The group manages to elude both and get to the gravesite. Before they can return the stone, Ramanathan's gang shows up. Senguttavan makes a deal with Ramanathan that after he places the stone in the King's grave, he can take it, to which he agrees. Senguttuvan and Elango place the stone in the grave and are therefore released from the curse. Ramanathan has one of his henchmen recover the stone.

Having completed the job, Senguttuvan and Elango bid goodbye to the four ghosts, who release themselves from the occupied bodies. The ghost occupying Chanakya's body allows an emotional Senguttavan to hear at last the voice of Chanakya and also a declaration of love from her. After Senguttavan and Elango bid a tearful farewell to Chidambaram, all four bodies are laid to rest.

During the credits, while Senguttavan and Elango are boarding a bus to return home, they bump into Ramanathan again, who is now on the run. He tells them as his henchman had touched the stone, he and his gang were pursued by the mysterious lorry and his henchman was killed, while he barely managed to escape. But a few minutes later, a pilgrim (Brahmanandam) who had earlier encountered Ramanathan and his gang while they were in pursuit of Senguttavan, Elango and the three ghosts, returns the stone to him, thus activating the curse on Ramanathan and the pilgrim.

Cast

Aadhi as Senguttuvan, a small-time crook who works under his friend's boss Ramdoss and wants to find Maragatha Naanayam.
Nikki Galrani as Chanakaya, Senguttuvan's love interest. She committed suicide and was took to put in Chidambaram's (Elango's uncle) friend's soul (Mahendran).
Anandaraj as "Twinkle" Ramanathan, the number one smuggler in Chennai who wants to recover Maragatha Naanayam.
Munishkanth (Ramdoss) as "Nochukuppam" Ramdoss, the smallest smuggler who drops all big deals because of his health conditions. One day, he dies and comes back for several reasons with a new soul, namely Chidambaram / Thothalavayan.
Daniel Annie Pope as Elango, Ramdoss's worker who does all deals and Senguttuvan's childhood friend who helps him find Maragatha Naanayam.
Mime Gopi as John, the dealer who deals with all smugglers to take Maragatha Naanayam after collaborating with a Chinese businessman, though they both get killed later.
Kota Srinivasa Rao as the priest who helps protect Senguttuvan and Elango from their curse.
M. S. Bhaskar as Pandurangan, the man who brings the fake Maragatha Naanayam for over 20 years.
Arunraja Kamaraj as the drunken dead body who gets decapitated and took Chidambaram's friend soul to help them. The soul name is Nesamani.
Sangili Murugan as the homeless dead body, a panhandler, and Tamizh Aiyaa (ghost).
Gajaraj as Krishnan, the doctor who protects Maragatha Naanayam for over 20 years.
Blade Shankar as Krishnan's son, a doctor.
Kaali Venkat as Chidambaram (Ghost) and Mahendran (Voice).
Brahmanandam as Pilot 
Shanthi Mani as Ramdoss's mother

Production
In May 2016, Axess Film Factory announced that they were making a fantasy-adventure comedy film directed by newcomer ARK.Saravan, who had worked an associate director to Ramkumar during Mundaasupatti (2014). Aadhi and Nikki Galrani were signed on to play the leading roles, marking their second collaboration after Yagavarayinum Naa Kaakka
 The film's shoot commenced on May 26, 2016, and the shoot was completed by August 10.

Music 
The film's soundtrack was composed by first-timer Dhibu Ninan Thomas and the audio rights are with Think Music.

Music of the film was released on 15 March 2017, through Think Music. The audio was initially slated to release on 19 January 2017, but postponed due to the upcoming Jallikattu protests.

Release 
The satellite rights of the film were sold to Zee Tamil.

Reception
Baradwaj Rangan of Film Companion wrote "The most welcome surprise in Maragatha Naanayam is that it isn’t just a collection of gags and scares, which is all this genre really needs".

References

External links
 

2017 films
2010s Tamil-language films
Indian black comedy films
Indian comedy horror films
Indian fantasy adventure films
Indian fantasy comedy films
2017 black comedy films
2017 comedy horror films
2010s fantasy adventure films
2010s fantasy comedy films
2017 directorial debut films